Tumi and the Volume is an African hip hop music ensemble that includes rapper Tumi Molekane, lead guitarist Tiago Correia-Paul, bass guitarist David Bergman and drummer Paulo Chibanga. The act is often associated with the Mozambican band 340ml because it shares some of its core members.

Their releases include the live album At The Bassline (2004), and the studio albums Tumi and the Volume (2006) and Pick a Dream (2010).

In December 2012 the band officially disbanded.

References

Sources

South African hip hop groups